L'Esposizione Internazionale Specializzata Genova '92 - Colombo '92 (in English International Exhibition Genoa '92 - Colombo '92) or more informally Expo 1992, was held in Genoa, Italy from 15 May to 15 August 1992. The theme was "Christopher Columbus, The Ship and the Sea", and the Expo was timed to celebrate the 500 years since the discovery of America by the Genoese sailor Christopher Columbus. Because of the theme, the expo was also known as Colombiadi. It was a specialized Exhibition with 54 countries represented. Total visitors were 694,800. The exposition ran at the same time as the larger and longer duration Seville Expo '92, a Universal Exposition, held in the city from whose port (on the Guadalquivir) Columbus had sailed in 1492. The expo's logo was a "500" number with Genoa's flag; the mascot was a cat dressed like Christopher Columbus called "Gatto Cristoforo"

Exposition
The International Exposition of Genoa '92 was held at the Porto Antico and allowed the entire redesign of the area, designed by the architect Renzo Piano. The aquarium hosted the sea's pavilion and the ship "Italia" hosted the ship's pavilion. Other important places were "Piazza delle Feste", a covered square, the "Magazzini del Cotone" an old port structure that now hosts the conference center, "Porta Siberia" a historical port's fortress and the "Palazzina Millo".

Participants
54 countries attended the event officially (three unofficially) and, initially, it was announced that the Expo reached about 1.7 million visitors, of 3,000,000 provided, but the count was later revised in only about 800,000 visitors. In the fall of 1992, it was discovered that the actual visitors were less than what was announced at first and that the Ente Colombo, who ran the event, had collected only 13 billion compared to 45 billion planned. Because of the false news circulated and the lack of success of the event, the Mayor Romano Merlo, who was also president of Colombo, resigned and was replaced by Deputy Mayor Claudio Burlando.

The guest of honor was the Government of the Bahamas, where Christopher Columbus first landed in the Americas on the island of Guanahani. Sculptures called "Obelisk" by Alessandro Matta and "Dolphin" by Bruno Elisei were displayed in the Bahamian hall, in homage to Columbus.

References

External links
Official website of the BIE
 European Patent Office

World's fairs in Italy
1992 in Italy
Culture in Genoa
Events in Genoa
20th century in Genoa